Arhopala centaurus, the centaur oakblue or dull oakblue, is a species of lycaenid or blue butterfly found in India and southeast Asia to the Philippines.

Description

Subspecies
A. c. centaurus  Kangean, Java, Bali, Lombok, Sumbawa, Sumatra, mainland New Guinea, Torres Strait islands, northern Australia (QLD), Moa Is.
A. c. asopus  Waterhouse & Lyell, [1914]   northern & northwestern Australia (NT), Koolan Is.
A. c. nakula  (C. & R. Felder, 1860)   Thailand, Laos, Vietnam, Hainan, S.Yunnan, Malay Peninsula, Singapore, Borneo, Singkep, Sumatra, Belitung, Bangka
A. c. aglais  C. & R. Felder, [1865]   Philippines (Luzon, Mindoro, Mindanao)
A. c. coruscans  Wood-Mason & de Nicéville, 1881   Andamans
A. c. pirama  (Moore, [1881])   Ceylon, South India
A. c. pirithous ( Moore, [1884])   North India, Assam, Sikkim, S.China, Hainan
A. c. centenitus  Fruhstorfer, 1914   Batu, Pagi
A. c. dixoni  Eliot, 1978   Malaysia
A. c. cuyoensis  Schröder & Treadaway, 1999   Philippines (Cuyo)
A. c. babuyana  Schröder & Treadaway, 1999  Philippines (Babuyanes)
A. c. decimarie  Schröder & Treadaway, 1999  Philippines (Homonhon)
A. c. dinacola  Schröder & Treadaway, 1999  Philippines (Dinagat)

Biology
The larva feeds on Terminalia tomentosa, Terminalia paniculata, Lagerstroemia microcarpa, Mangifera indica and Xylia dolabriformis

References

External links

Arhopala
Butterflies of Asia
Butterflies of Singapore
Butterflies described in 1775
Taxa named by Johan Christian Fabricius